Catedral de Nuestra Señora de La Asunción is the seat of the Roman Catholic Diocese of Margarita and is located in La Asunción, Nueva Esparta state, on Margarita Island, Venezuela. Completed in 1571, it is the oldest church in Venezuela.

History
it was Built between 1570 and 1571, the Catedral Nuestra Señora de La Asunción is the oldest church in Venezuela and was one of the first in the Americas. Its construction was started in 1570 (much before the construction of the cathedral of Santa Ana de Coro) and was never completed. The church was founded by a member of the Dominican order, the priest Juan de Manzanillo. It was later destroyed by French Lutherans, and by the year 1602 the cathedral was reported to be "en ruinas", in ruins. Work for reconstruction of the building began again in 1609, and the cathedral was finally completed eleven years later, in 1621.

Features

Set in the tree lined Plaza Bolivar, the church has a rectangular plan with massive walls as protection against pirate attacks. There is a bell tower outside, which is unique and the bells are now preserved in the plaza. One of the most important religious buildings on the Island, the Virgin of La Asunción is worshiped here. The cathedral has been declared a historical city monument. It has a plain façade and interior, but its left lateral tower, which dates to 1599, is the oldest in the country. The façade at the entrance portal of the church is built in the renaissance style. It was considered a model church till the 19th century.

Festival
The most important festival in the Liturgical year is held in mid-August, to celebrate the Assumption of the Virgin Mary. A procession is held and mass offered in the church.

See also
Catholic Church in Venezuela
List of cathedrals in Venezuela

Roman Catholic churches completed in 1571
Roman Catholic churches completed in 1621
Roman Catholic cathedrals in Venezuela
Margarita Island
Buildings and structures in Nueva Esparta
Spanish Colonial architecture in Venezuela
Tourist attractions in Nueva Esparta
1571 establishments in the Spanish Empire
Buildings and structures in La Asunción
16th-century Roman Catholic church buildings in Venezuela